Pavao Štoos (10 December 1806 – 30 March 1862) was a Croatian poet, priest and a revivalist.

After graduating theology in Zagreb, he served as a bishop's secretary for a brief period, and from 1842 he was a pastor of the Pokupsko parish.

Štoos is a notable person among Croatian patriots; as the author of a well-known elegy Kip domovine vu početku leta 1831, collaborator of Ljudevit Gaj's Danica ilirska, he clearly articulated his concerns over the foreign oppression and the de-nationalisation of the common people (vre i svoj jezik zabit Horvati hote ter drugi narod postati). Štoos pessimistically observes contemporary political and cultural movements, seeing the country as if trapped in the darkness of a dungeon (srce od plača ne mrem zdržati).

Besides the literature, he was also engaged in music and has published in 1858 Kitice srkvenih pjesama s napjevima. He is the author of the song "Poziv u kolo ilirsko".

In 1862 he was appointed as a Zagreb canon, but he died before he managed to officially receive the title.

References

 

1806 births
1862 deaths
Croatian male poets
People from Dubravica
19th-century Croatian Roman Catholic priests
Burials at Mirogoj Cemetery
19th-century Croatian poets
19th-century male writers
People of the Illyrian movement